The Captain from Cologne is an East German film directed by Slatan Dudow. It was released in 1956.

Cast
 Rolf Ludwig as Albert Hauptmann
 Erwin Geschonneck as Hans Karjanke
 Else Wolz as Adele
 Christel Bodenstein as Hannelore Ullrich
 Kurt Steingraf as Pferdapfel / Baron v. Kohlen und Stahlbach
 Manfred Borges as Max Steinmetz
 Ruth Baldor as Baronin Pferdapfel
 Marie-Luise Etzel as Daisy Pferdeapfel, Tochter
 Johannes Arpe as Bürgermeister Dr. Seekatz
 Hans W. Hamacher as Dr. Brandstätter, Bundestagsabgeordneter
 Horst Koch as Generalfeldmarschall Kesselmeyer
 Herbert Körbs as General Haudorf
 Heinrich Gies as Dinkelburg

External links
 

1956 films
1956 comedy films
German comedy films
East German films
1950s German-language films
German satirical films
Fictional captains
Films set in West Germany
Films shot in Germany
Films set in Cologne
Films directed by Slatan Dudow
1950s German films